Zerkegem is a village in the Belgian province West Flanders in Jabbeke, a municipality in Belgium. Zerkegem is located between the Polders in the north and the sandy regions of the south.

Famous Inhabitants
 Romain Maes, the 1935 winner of the Tour de France.

References

External links
Zerkegem @ City Review

Populated places in West Flanders